Oumar Sidibé (born 12 February 2001) is a French professional footballer who plays as a winger for  club Paris 13 Atletico.

Career 
A youth product of Paris 13 Atletico, Sidibé moved to Valenciennes in 2019. He made his professional debut for the club in a 1–0 Ligue 2 win over Grenoble on 20 November 2021.

On 6 July 2022, Sidibé returned to Paris 13 Atletico.

References

External links

2001 births
Living people
French footballers
French sportspeople of Malian descent
Black French sportspeople
Association football wingers
Paris 13 Atletico players
Valenciennes FC players
Ligue 2 players
Championnat National 2 players